Shooting competitions at the 2021 Southeast Asian Games took place at Hanoi National Sports Training Centre in Hanoi, Vietnam from 16 to 22 May 2022.

Medal table

Medalists

Men

Women

Mixed

References

Shooting
Southeast Asian Games
2021